is a network infrastructuretelecommunications company, formerly Allied Telesyn. Headquartered in Japan, their North American headquarters are in San Jose, California. Founded in 1987, the company is a global provider of secure Ethernet & IP access solutions along with deployment of IP triple play networks over copper and fiber access infrastructure.

Company history
March 1987, System Plus Co. is established with 1 million Yen capital stock.
September, 1987 The company is renamed Allied Telesis K.K.
April 1990, Capital stock is increased to 99 million Yen.
February 1991, Allied Telesyn Intl. (Asia) Pte., Ltd. is established in Singapore.
June 1995, Allied Telesyn Intl. Pty Ltd. is established in Australia.
November 1995, Malaysia Sales Office opens.
June 1997, Capital stock is increased to 734 million Yen.
July 1997, Taiwan Representative Office is launched.
May 1999, Acquires a networking division from Teltrend Ltd., US.
May 1999, Centrecom Systems Ltd. is established in UK.
June 2000, Allied Telesyn Europe Service S.r.l. is established in Italy.
June 2000, Allied Telesyn Korea Co., Ltd. is established in the Republic of Korea.
July 2000, Allied Telesis K.K. is listed on the Second Section of the Tokyo Stock Exchange.
October 2000, Allied Telesyn Labs New Zealand Ltd., an R&D center, is established in Christchurch, New Zealand.
March 2001, Allied Telesyn Philippines Inc. is established in the Philippines as a software development base.
March 2001, Allied Telesyn International m.b.H is established in Austria.
September 2001, Allied Telesis (Suzhou) Co., Ltd. is established in China.
October 2001, Allied Telesyn Networks Inc., an R&D center, is established in North Carolina, US.
January 2002, Allied Telesis International SA is established in Switzerland.
February 2002, Allied Telesyn International S.L.U. is established in Spain.
July 2004, Allied Telesis K.K. is renamed Allied Telesis Holdings K.K.
March 2005, Allied Telesis K.K. acquires ROOT Inc, a wireless networking company.
May 2005, Allied Telesis Capital Corp is established in Washington state, US.
December 2006, Allied Telesis Capital Corp opens branch on Yokota Air Base, Japan.
June 2007, Allied Telesis launches Switchblade x908 Advanced Layer 3 High-capacity stackable chassis switch.
July 2007, Allied Telesis Yokota AFB Branch rolls out IPTV as part of its IVVD contract with AAFES to the Yokota Community.
Summer 2008, Allied Telesis Yokota AFB Branch adds 23 channels to its video lineup.
September 2008, Allied Telesis Yokota AFB Branch upgrades to a tier one voice carrier for telephony calls to the states.
November 2008, Allied Telesis launches "Green" Eco-friendly networking products to the market.
 October 2012, Allied Telesis launches SwitchBlade x8112 Advanced Layer 3 twelve-slot chassis switch.
 Aprril 2014, Allied Telesis launches SBx81CFC960 controller card with terabit fabric for the SwitchBlade x8112.
 July 2014, Allied Telesis launches x310 series stackable edge switches.
 May 2015, Allied Telesis launches x930 series high-performance distribution switch.
 May 2015, Allied Telesis launches AR3050S and AR4050S Next-Generation Firewall appliances.
 August 2015, Sri Lanka’s Expressway Traffic Management System Adopts Allied Telesis Solutions.

Products
Allied Telesis is primarily a provider of equipment for enterprise customers, along with educational and government segments. They also serve moderate and small businesses. Their POTS-to-10G iMAP (integrated Multiservice Access Platform) and iMG (intelligent Multiservice Gateways), in conjunction with advanced switching, secure VPN routing solutions, enable public and private network operators and service providers of all sizes to deploy scalable, carrier-grade networks for the cost-effective delivery of packet-based voice, video and data services.

The current product range includes:
 AlliedWare Plus switches:
 x220 Series Layer 3 Gigabit Edge Switches
 x230 Series Layer 3 Gigabit Edge Switches
 x320 Series Layer 3 Gigabit PoE++ Switches
 x530/x530L Series Layer 3 Stackable Gigabit Dual PSU Switches
 x550 Series 1G/2.5G/5G/10G/40G Layer 3 Stackable Switches
 x930 Series 1G/10G/40G Layer 3 Stackable Dual PSU Switches
 x950 Series 10G/40G/100G Stackable Layer 3 Managed Switches
 SwitchBlade x908Gen2 Layer 3 stackable eight-slot chassis switch
 SwitchBlade x8112 Layer 3 twelve-slot chassis switch
 integrated Multiservice Access Platforms available as multi-slot chassis or a 1RU "miniMAP", provide FTTx or xDSL "last mile" access to end-customers
 intelligent Multiservice Gateways (iMG) deliver voice, video and data over the "last mile"
 Switches range from the SBx908 advanced layer 3 gigabit switches to the AT-8000S layer 2 managed fast Ethernet stackable switches. Smart switches and Unmanaged switches are also available in the portfolio. Many of the switches are designed for low power Eco-friendly operation, significantly reducing customer OPEX, and the impact on the environment.
 Routers range from the AR700 series of central site routers for terminating multiple VPNs with system redundancy, to the AR200 series of home office routers with ADSL broadband connections and WLAN options.
 Media Converters, the range includes the Converteon  an 18-slot managed media conversion system, a multi-channel media converter, and a range of stand-alone media converters
 Wireless LAN products cover a range of access points and wireless coverage for "last mile" solutions
 Network Adapter Cards, a comprehensive range of fiber and copper 10/100/1000 plug-and-play NICs
 Internet Service Provider, Contracted by AAFES (Army Air Forces Exchange Service) to provide Triple Play Services
 Corega: Originally, Corega Inc. was established in 1996 for offering networking hardware products, network router, network switch and wireless router for consumer market and small business. In 2009, Allied Telesis K.K. acquired Corega Inc, then it started as one brand (division).

See also 

 AlliedWare Plus
 SwitchBlade
 List of networking hardware vendors

References

External links
 Official website 
 Allied Telesis Capital Corp Service Yokota 

Electronics companies of Japan
Networking hardware companies
Telecommunications equipment vendors
Electronics companies established in 1987
Telecommunications companies established in 1987
1987 establishments in Japan
Companies listed on the Tokyo Stock Exchange
Japanese brands